Futbolo Klubas Riteriai, also known as FK Riteriai or as Riteriai, is a Lithuanian professional football club based in Vilnius. The team has been playing in the top level of Lithuanian football, the A Lyga, since 2014. Until 21 February 2019, the club was based in Trakai and was known as FK Trakai.

The team's colors are yellow and blue. The club plays at LFF Stadium in Vilnius (capacity 5,067).

History

2005–2013
The club was established in 2005 as a way to promote physical activity to children and the general society. In 2006, the club laid an artificial coverage stadium in Trakai and started to play in the III Lyga Vilnius County. In 2008, they also played in the Sunday Football League. In 2010, they were admitted to the II Lyga South Zone, and in 2011, they were already in the I Lyga (second-tier division in Lithuania). Before the 2013 season, the club submitted an application to play in the A Lyga, as all three top finishers decided against seeking promotion, promising to play games in Vilnius before adequate infrastructure requirements could be fulfilled, but ultimately remained in the same tier. They were promoted to A Lyga after finishing 3rd in the 2013 LFF I Lyga season. The club also reached the semi-finals of the 2013–14 Lithuanian Football Cup, before being eliminated by the eventual winners, VMFD Žalgiris.  During summer, the club organizes youth camps with invitees from AC Milan.

2014–present
The club began preparation for the 2014 campaign by strengthening their first team, which included signing Lithuanian national team veterans, Paulius Grybauskas, Vytautas Lukša, Darius Miceika, and Tadas Labukas, as well as unveiling former star Edgaras Jankauskas as their new head coach. They debuted in the A Lyga victoriously, beating Klaipėdos Granitas 2–0. Throughout the season, the club's results plateaued, but they managed to climb up to second place around the mid-season break. Trakai continued to strengthen their core and staff personnel through mid-season. On 19 September 2014, another national team star, Deividas Česnauskis, was signed on. Soon afterwards, the club was eliminated from the 2014–15 Lithuanian Football Cup by Šilas. With 7 matches remaining, Trakai was still in 2nd place in the league, but a losing streak followed. On 3 November 2014, Jankauskas was fired by the club. Virmantas Lemežis took over as caretaker and managed to stabilize things. As a result, the team finished in 4th place, qualifying for the 2015–16 UEFA Europa League. On 27 November 2014, Trakai announced the signing of the former Ekranas manager, Valdas Urbonas, as development director, but during the club's season roundup event, he was announced as new manager for the upcoming season. The Trakai reserve team also finished third in the A Lyga's reserves competitions that season.

In 2015, some veteran players left the team. On 2 July 2015, FK Trakai debuted in the UEFA Europa League qualification round against HB Torshavn from the Faroe Islands. Trakai won 7–1. However, it lost in the Europa League's second qualifying round to the Cypriot club Apollon Limassol. In the first leg, Trakai lost 4–0. In the second leg, they drew 0–0. In the 2015 A Lyga season, Trakai became the vice-champion of Lithuania and qualified to 2016–17 UEFA Europa League's first qualifying round. It was the most successful FK Trakai season. Before 2016 A Lyga's season, the top 2015 season defenders, Linas Klimavičius, Edvardas Gaurilovas, Nikolaz Apakitze, Sergej Shevchuk, Marius Šalkauskas, Ronald Solomin and Rokas Stanulevičius, left the team. But the team managed to keep last season's leaders, Yuri Mamaev, Marius Rapalis, and Deividas Česnauskis. Trakai saved the core of the team and signed contracts with a few newcomers. The team signed a legionnaire from Italy, Mattia Broli, and former Lithuanian national football players, Arūnas Klimavičius, and Martynas Dapkus. In 2018, the team saw a change in coaching. In May, Oleg Vasilenko was fired, and Kibu Vicuña was hired as the team's head coach. He worked with the team in the Europa League tournament, but left in October and went to Wisła Płock.

Stadium

Since 2014, the club has played at LFF Stadium in Vilnius. The stadium, formerly known as Vėtra Stadium, was built in 2004 and holds up to 5,500 spectators. After the bankruptcy of the FK Vėtra football club, the Lithuanian Football Federation took control of the stadium. The stadium is under reconstruction in an effort to meet level 3 UEFA stadium status, with the capacity expected to be extended to 8,000.

Achievements
A Lyga
Runners-up (2): 2015, 2016
3rd place (3): 2017, 2018, 2019
Lithuanian Cup 
Runners-up (1): 2016
Lithuanian Super Cup
Runners-up (2): 2016, 2017

Season by season

Sponsors

Kit
FK Trakai uniform colors are yellow for home games. Away uniforms were black and red (like AC Milan) from 2014 till 2018. Since 2018, away uniforms have been dark blue.

Uniform manufacturers
 2011–14 Patrick
 2015– Nike

European record

Accurate as of 26 August 2020

Source: UEFA.comPld = Matches played; W = Matches won; D = Matches drawn; L = Matches lost; GF = Goals for; GA = Goals against; GD = Goal Difference. Defunct competitions indicated in italics.

Notes
 PR: Preliminary round
 1Q: First qualifying round
 2Q: Second qualifying round
 3Q: Third qualifying round

Current squad

Out on loan

Notable players
Players who have either appeared in at least one match for their respective national teams at any time or received an individual award while at the club. Players whose names are listed in bold represented their countries while playing for FK Trakai or FK Riteriai.

Lithuania

 Valdemar Borovskij
 Deividas Česnauskis
 Martynas Dapkus
 Paulius Grybauskas
 Justinas Januševskij
 Donatas Kazlauskas
 Arūnas Klimavičius
 Linas Klimavičius
 Tadas Labukas
 Vytautas Lukša
 Justinas Marazas
 Darius Miceika
 Marius Rapalis
 Vaidotas Šilėnas
 Tomas Švedkauskas
 Nerijus Valskis
 Modestas Vorobjovas

Europe

 Diniyar Bilyaletdinov 
 David Arshakyan
 Alyaksandr Bychanok
 Yury Kendysh   
 Giorgos Pelagias
 Eugen Zasavițchi
 Yuri Mamaev

Africa

 Oscar Dorley

Trakai Player of the Year
Since 2014, a Player of the Year award is presented during an annual season closeup event. From 2014–16, nominees were elected by Trakai players. However, since 2017, the award is determined by using InStat data.

Staff

Academy

FK Riteriai run their own football academy, which keeps close relationship with AC Milan. The academy is called Talentų futbolo akademija, it was established in 2013.

Managers

References

External links
 Official website

 
Riteriai
Riteriai